William Henry Crouch (December 3, 1886 – December 22, 1945) was a Major League Baseball pitcher during part of the 1910 season.  The 6'1", 210 lb. left-hander was a native of Kiamensi, Delaware.

Crouch started one game for the St. Louis Browns. On July 12, 1910, he faced the Washington Senators at American League Park and the opposing pitcher was Walter Johnson, a future Hall of Famer.  They dueled to a 4–4 score at the end of eight innings and the game ended as a tie.

In Crouch's eight innings of work he gave up just three earned runs, and his brief MLB career ended with a 0–0 record and a 3.38 ERA.

External links
Baseball Reference
Retrosheet

Major League Baseball pitchers
Baseball players from Delaware
St. Louis Browns players
1886 births
1945 deaths